The Foursquare Church is an Evangelical Pentecostal Christian denomination founded in 1923 by preacher Aimee Semple McPherson. The headquarters are in Los Angeles, California, United States.

History

The church has its origins in a vision of "Foursquare Gospel" (or "Full Gospel") during a sermon in October 1922 in Oakland, California by the evangelist Aimee Semple McPherson.  According to chapter 1 of Book of Ezekiel, Ezekiel had a vision of God as revealed to be four different aspects: a man, a lion, an ox and an eagle. It also represents the four aspects of Christ: "Savior, Baptizer with the Holy Spirit, Healer and Soon and Coming King." This was the vision and name she gave at Foursquare Church, founded in 1923 in Los Angeles. Despite some affinities with Pentecostals, her beliefs are  interdenominational.  She opened the Angelus Temple in Echo Park in 1923, seating 5,300 people.  The attendance has become a megachurch with 10,000 people. McPherson was a flamboyant celebrity in her day, participating in publicity events, such as weekly Sunday parades through the streets of Los Angeles, along with the mayor and movie stars, directly to Angelus Temple. She built the temple, as well as what is now known as Life Pacific University adjacent to it, on the northwest corner of land that she owned in the middle of the city.

McPherson's celebrity status continued after her death, with biopics such as the 1976 Hallmark Hall of Fame drama The Disappearance of Aimee depicting her life, as well as the 2006 independent film Aimee Semple McPherson, which particularly focused on her month-long disappearance in May–June 1926 and the legal controversy that followed.

After Aimee Semple McPherson's death in 1944, her son Rolf K. McPherson became president and leader of the church, a position he held for 44 years.   The Foursquare Church formed the "Pentecostal Fellowship of North America" in 1948 in Des Moines, Iowa, in an alliance with the Assemblies of God, the Church of God, the Open Bible Standard Churches, the Pentecostal Holiness Church, and others. In 1994, 46 years after the founding of the Pentecostal Fellowship, it was reorganized as the Pentecostal/Charismatic Churches of North America after combining with African-American organizations, most significantly the Church of God in Christ.

In 1968, the Calvary Chapel Costa Mesa congregation of the International Church of the Foursquare Gospel (under pastor  Chuck Smith) broke from the denomination and later formed an association of autonomous Charismatic Evangelical churches, today making up the Charismatic but non-Pentecostal denomination, Calvary Chapel. 

On May 31, 1988, John R. Holland became the Church's third President, a position he held until July 1997.

Harold Helms served as interim president from July 1997 until July 1998; he was followed by Paul C. Risser, who became the president on April 16, 1998, at the church's 75th annual convention.

In October 2003, under Risser's tenure, the church sold Los Angeles radio station KFSG-FM to the Spanish Broadcasting System for $250 million.  Risser's leadership led to another high-profile controversy for the church, when, without the involvement of the denomination's board of directors and finance council, church funds were invested in firms that targeted the "close-knit evangelical community"  but turned out to be Ponzi schemes.  Risser resigned his leadership position under fire in March 2004.

Jack W. Hayford, founder of The Church On The Way in Van Nuys, California served as the president of the Foursquare Church from 2004 to 2009. Hayford along with Pastors Roy Hicks Jr. in Eugene, Oregon, Jerry Cook in Gresham, Oregon, Ronald D. Mehl of the Beaverton Foursquare Church in Beaverton, Oregon, and John Holland in Vancouver, British Columbia, have been credited by the church with setting a plan for the denomination's continued survival despite its staggering financial losses estimated at $15 million under the failed leadership of Paul Risser.

The Foursquare denomination, under Hayford's leadership, is in "Missional Conversation" with the emerging church movement, claimed to be part of a "Church Multiplication" effort.  "Church Multiplication" also supports the house church movement through resources that support the expansion of "Foursquare Simple Church Networks."

In 2020, Randy Remington became the President of The Foursquare Church.

Statistics
On the denomination's website, they claim that in 2022, it had 67,500 churches, with 8.8 million members in 150 countries.

Beliefs
The beliefs of the Foursquare Church are expressed in its Declaration of Faith, compiled by its founder Aimee Semple McPherson. McPherson also authored a shorter, more concise creedal statement.

The church believes in the verbal inspiration of the Bible, the doctrine of the Trinity, and the deity of Jesus Christ. It believes that human beings were created in the image of God but, because of the Fall, are naturally depraved and sinful. It believes in the substitutionary atonement accomplished by the death of Christ. The church teaches that salvation is by grace through faith and not by good works. Believers are justified by faith and born again upon repentance and acceptance of Christ as Lord and king. Consistent with its belief in human free will, the Foursquare Church also teaches that it is possible for a believer to backslide or commit apostasy.

The Foursquare Church is a Finished Work Pentecostal denomination, teaching that sanctification is a continual process of spiritual growth. Christian perfection and holiness can be attained through surrender and consecration to God. This spiritual growth is believed to be promoted by Bible study and prayer. The Foursquare Church believes in the baptism with the Holy Spirit as an event separate from conversion that empowers the individual and the wider church to fulfill the church's mission of evangelization. The Foursquare Church expects Spirit baptism to be received in the same manner as recorded in the Book of Acts, namely that the believer will receive spiritual gifts, including speaking in tongues. The church believes that spiritual gifts continue in operation for the edification of the church.

The Foursquare Church believes that divine healing is a part of Christ's atonement. It teaches that the sick can be healed in response to prayer. The Foursquare Church anticipates a premillennial return of Christ to earth. It believes that there will be a future final judgment where the righteous will receive everlasting life and the wicked everlasting punishment. The Foursquare Church observes believer's baptism by immersion and the Lord's Supper or Holy Communion as ordinances. Open communion is practiced. Anointing of the sick and tithing are practiced as well.

Structure
The denomination's church government has an "episcopal character" that dates back to its founder. McPherson had veto power over church decisions, appointed all officers, and hired all employees.

The Foursquare Convention is the chief decision making body of the Foursquare Church. Meeting regularly every year, the convention's voting membership includes international officers and licensed ministers. Each Foursquare church located in the United States has the right to send one voting delegate per every 50 church members. National Foursquare Churches outside of the United States may send one official delegate to the convention.

A board of 12 to 20 directors manages the Foursquare Church. In addition to overseeing the Church's activities, the board of directors appoints officers and is responsible for licensing and ordaining ministers. Members of the board include the president, vice presidents, and at least nine ministers representing geographic regions. Church members in good standing may also be appointed to the board.

Local Foursquare churches are subordinate parts of the International Church of the Foursquare Gospel and are operated according to the bylaws of the international church. There are two categories of Foursquare churches. A "charter member church" is a member church that has no legal existence apart from the international church and whose property is owned by the international church. The second category is "covenant member church", which include "pioneer churches" and previously non-member churches. Pioneer churches are recently established church plants that have not been upgraded to charter member status. Covenant member churches might also be previously non-member churches that join the Foursquare Church but choose not to transfer their real property to the international church. Non-member churches may choose to affiliate with the International Church of the Foursquare Gospel without becoming a full member of the international church. These "community member churches" retain their separate legal identities and autonomy.

North America
Three colleges are affiliated with the Foursquare Church: Life Pacific University, formerly "L. I. F. E. Bible College," in San Dimas, California, Life Pacific College Virginia in Christiansburg, Virginia, and Pacific Life Bible College in Surrey, British Columbia.

In 2006, membership in the United States was 353,995 in 1,875 churches. While congregations are concentrated along the West Coast, the denomination is well distributed across the United States. The states with the highest membership rates are Oregon, Hawaii, Montana, Washington, and California.

South America

Foursquare Church in Ecuador
The Foursquare Church arrived in Ecuador in 1956 with the arrival of a couple by the name of Gadberry. Acting as missionaries under the auspices of the Los Angeles congregation, they began by founding churches in Guayaquil. They remained in Ecuador until 1960, but returned a year later to found the first Foursquare church in Quito. As of 2012, there were 200 Foursquare churches in Ecuador, with 32 in Guayaquil alone.

Controversies
In 2004, the denomination's president and treasurer resigned after losing US$14 million of the denomination for approving two financial investment projects that were in fact a scam.

In 2013, under Burris' leadership, the Church lost $2 million in a failed investment of a Broadway play based on the life of Aimee Semple McPherson.

See also
 Church of the Foursquare Gospel in the Philippines
 List of the largest Protestant bodies
 World Evangelical Alliance
 Believers' Church
 Worship service (evangelicalism)

References

Further reading
 Epstein, Daniel Mark. Sister Aimee
 Foursquare Gospel Publications. The Foursquare Church Annual Report 2006.
 Glenmary Research Center. Religious Congregations & Membership in the United States (2000).
 Mead, Frank S., Samuel S. Hill, and Craig D. Atwood. Handbook of Denominations in the United States.
 Melton, J. Gordon  (ed.). Encyclopedia of American Religions.
 Van Cleave, Nathaniel M. The Vine and the Branches: A History of the International Church of the Foursquare Gospel.

External links
The Foursquare Church
Foursquare Church Canada
Foursquare Church Malaysia
Iglesia del Evangelio Cuadrangular de España
Iglesia Cuadrangular de Argentina
Iglesia Cristiana Carismática Cuadrángular

 
Christian denominations established in the 20th century
Christian denominations in Nigeria
Christian organizations established in 1927
Christianity in Los Angeles
Evangelical denominations in North America
Finished Work Pentecostals
Members of the National Association of Evangelicals
Pentecostal denominations
Pentecostalism in the United States
Premillennialism
Religious belief systems founded in the United States
Religious organizations based in the United States